"Satan Live" is a song by English electronic music duo Orbital. It contains various live recordings made by the group in 1996. "Satan Live" is one of Orbital's biggest hits, with the CD version reaching number three on the UK Singles Chart (their highest position on that chart alongside "The Saint") while the vinyl version, which overran the time limit for the singles chart, reached number 48 on the UK Albums Chart. In Ireland, the live version peaked at number seven.

Original version
The original studio version of "Satan" was included on the III EP in 1990 and on the US version of the album Orbital. Issued as a single on 7 January 1990, the original version peaked at number 31 on the UK Singles Chart.

"Evil Santa"
In December 1996, the promotional triple CD box set was called "Evil Santa", an anagram of Satan Live. All three releases in the series came in a standard CD-single jewel case. Each had a 6 on the inlay spine so the three together form the number "666".

Track listings
CD1
 "Satan" (live at the Irving Plaza, New York) – 7:12
 "Out There Somewhere" (live at the Irving Plaza, New York) – 17:46

CD2
 "Satan" (live at the V96 Festival, Chelmsford) – 7:41
 "Lush 3" (live at Axis Boston) – 7:31
 "The Girl with the Sun in Her Head" (live at Axis Boston) – 7:45

CD3
 "Satan" (Industry Standard edit - studio version) – 3:44
 "Chime (live at the V96 Festival, Chelmsford) – 7:05
 "Impact" (live at the V96 Festival, Chelmsford) – 12:52

Double 12-inch pack

Side A:
 "Satan" (live at the V96 Festival, Chelmsford) – 7:41
Side B:
 "Chime" (live at the V96 Festival, Chelmsford) – 7:05
 "Impact" (live at the V96 Festival, Chelmsford) – 12:52
Side C:
 "Lush 3" (live at Axis Boston) – 7:31
 "The Girl with the Sun in Her Head" (live at Axis Boston) – 7:45
Side D:
 "Out There Somewhere" (live at the Irving Plaza, New York) – 17:46
 "Choice" (live at the Irving Plaza, New York) – 5:12

"Irving Plaza" is misspelt as "Irvine Plaza" on the single. While the CD singles have crowd noise mixed in, the double 12-inch pack features no crowd noise.

Charts

Weekly charts
Original version

"Satan Live"

Year-end charts
"Satan Live"

Release history

References

External links
 Official Orbital website

1991 singles
1996 singles
1996 songs
FFRR Records singles
Orbital (band) songs